Pyrrosia lingua is a species of epiphytic fern in the family Polypodiaceae. It occurs through China, Southeast Asia and into Japan and Taiwan, China. Pyrrosia lingua is grown as a cultivated plant, and multiple named cultivars have been developed.

References

K.H. Shing, (1983). A Reclassification of the Fern Genus Pyrrosia, American Fern Journal, Vol. 73, No. 3.
W.L. Chiou, C.E. Martin, T.C. Lin, C.C. Hsu, S.H. Lin and K.C. Lin, (2005). Ecophysiological Differences between Sterile and Fertile Fronds of the Subtropical Epiphytic Fern Pyrrosia lingua (Polypodiaceae) in Taiwan, American Fern Journal, Vol. 95, No. 4.

Polypodiaceae
Ferns of Asia
Endemic flora of Taiwan
Plants described in 1784